Anthony Othneal Straker (born 23 September 1988) is a semi-professional footballer who most recently played for National League South side Havant & Waterlooville. A defender or midfielder, he has also been capped on ten occasions by the Grenada national football team.

Club career

Born in Ealing, London, Straker started his career in the youth system at Crystal Palace, and was a trainee with the club. He went on trial with League One club Yeovil Town in March 2007 before being released by Palace.

Straker signed a one-year contract with Conference Premier club Aldershot Town on 6 August 2007, after a successful pre-season trial. After impressing in the first half of the season, Straker signed a contract extension in February 2008, keeping him at Aldershot Town until June 2010. That season, he was a member of the team that won the Conference League Cup and the Conference Premier title. During the January transfer window of 2011, Straker completed a one-month loan deal with Wycombe Wanderers.

On 2 July 2012 Straker moved to Southend United, signing a two-year contract. Aldershot were entitled to a fee for his transfer as he was under the age of 23. This was agreed to be £17,500 plus add ons.

Straker signed for League Two club York City on 12 June 2014 on a two-year contract after rejecting a new deal with Southend. He made his debut in York's 1–1 away draw with Tranmere Rovers in the opening match of the 2014–15 season on 9 August 2014.

Having played infrequently for York under Russ Wilcox, Straker moved on loan to Scottish Premiership club Motherwell until the end of 2014–15 on 29 January 2015. He made his debut in a 1–1 draw at home to St Johnstone two days later. He made 13 appearances before returning to York. Straker left the club by mutual consent on 22 January 2016.

On 12 February 2016, Straker signed for National League club Grimsby Town on a contract until the end of 2015–16, after a successful trial. Straker was released when his contract expired at the end of the season.

On 21 June 2016, Straker returned to Aldershot Town after a four-year absence on a one-year contract.

On 20 May 2017, Straker dropped down a division by signing for National League South club Bath City, despite being offered a new contract by Aldershot.

On 14 May 2019, it was announced that Straker's contract had been mutually terminated, with the defender agreeing terms with newly relegated, Havant & Waterlooville.

International career
Straker made his debut for the England national under-18 team in a 1–0 away defeat to Turkey in a friendly on 17 November 2005, and he was substituted for Chris Riley in the 77th minute. He gained one more cap, playing in a 2–1 home win over Slovenia in another friendly on 17 April 2006, being substituted for Adam Watts at half-time. In January 2008, Straker was called up to the Barbados national team for the upcoming CONCACAF First Round qualifier for the 2010 FIFA World Cup against Dominica, though he did not play.

In May 2011, he was called up for the Grenadian national team for the upcoming CONCACAF Gold Cup. Straker played in two pre-tournament friendlies, including his debut in a 2–2 home draw with Antigua and Barbuda on 27 May 2011. He made his competitive debut for Grenada in their first match in the Gold Cup, a 4–0 loss to Jamaica at the Home Depot Center on 6 June 2011. Straker played in their two remaining group stage fixtures, a 7–1 defeat to Honduras at the FIU Stadium on 10 June 2011 and a 4–0 defeat to Guatemala at the Red Bull Arena on 13 June. He played in Grenada's three 2012 Caribbean Cup qualification second round matches, although they missed out on qualifying for the tournament after finishing in third place in their group on goal difference. He scored his first international goal with a 33rd-minute penalty kick in Grenada's 3–1 home defeat to Haiti in a 2018 FIFA World Cup qualifier on 4 September 2015.

Style of play
Straker primarily plays as a left winger, having been converted from playing at left back during 2009–10.

Career statistics

Club

International

International goals
As of match played 8 September 2015. Grenada score listed first, score column indicates score after each Straker goal.

Honours
Aldershot Town
Conference Premier: 2007–08
Conference League Cup: 2007–08

References

External links

Anthony Straker profile at the Bath City F.C. website

1988 births
Living people
Footballers from Ealing
English footballers
England youth international footballers
Grenadian footballers
Grenada international footballers
Association football defenders
Association football midfielders
Crystal Palace F.C. players
Aldershot Town F.C. players
Wycombe Wanderers F.C. players
Southend United F.C. players
York City F.C. players
Motherwell F.C. players
Grimsby Town F.C. players
Bath City F.C. players
Havant & Waterlooville F.C. players
National League (English football) players
English Football League players
Scottish Professional Football League players
2011 CONCACAF Gold Cup players
Black British sportspeople
English people of Barbadian descent
English sportspeople of Grenadian descent